Curtis Edward Warner (born March 18, 1961) is an American former professional football player who was a running back in the National Football League (NFL).  A two-time All-American at Penn State University, Warner was drafted by the Seattle Seahawks in the first round of the 1983 NFL Draft. Warner was inducted into the College Football Hall of Fame on December 8, 2009.

Warner was the 1983 AFC Offensive Player of the Year in his rookie NFL season.

Penn State
Warner was a standout at Pineville High School in Pineville, West Virginia, graduating in a class of only 90 students. He would lead Penn State in rushing in 1980, 1981, and 1982, and help the Nittany Lions capture their first national championship in the 1983 Sugar Bowl. When his collegiate career was over, he owned 42 Penn State records (his 3,398 career rushing yards is 3rd in school history, and his 18 100-yard rushing games remains a Penn State record).  On October 30, 2010, Evan Royster surpassed Warner to take over the career rushing yards record. He was named an All-American twice, in 1981 and 1982.

Warner earned a Bachelor of Arts in speech communication from Penn State in 1983.

Statistics

Professional career
Warner was the third overall pick of the 1983 NFL draft, selected by the Seattle Seahawks. He followed future hall of famers John Elway and Eric Dickerson.

Warner led the AFC in rushing yards his rookie season in 1983, helping Seattle to its first Conference Championship game which they lost to the Los Angeles Raiders, the eventual league champion. The following year, Warner suffered a torn ACL in the 1984 season opener against Cleveland and was sidelined for the rest of the year. He came back in the 1985 and had a number of successful seasons before ending his career with the Los Angeles Rams.

Warner is a three-time Pro Bowler (1983, 1986, 1987), and was inducted into the Seattle Seahawks Ring of Honor in 1994.

After football
Warner owned Curt Warner Chevrolet in Vancouver, Washington from 1999 until 2010. He is the current running backs coach at Camas High School in Camas, Washington and founder and president of the Curt Warner Autism Foundation.

Warner and his wife Ana have three sons, Jonathan, twins Austin and Christian, and a daughter, Isabella.

In 2018, Little A published The Warner Boys: Our Family's Story of Autism and Hope, written by Curt Warner and Ana Warner with Dave Boling. The book explores Warner's family life, including how it has been impacted by having twin boys (Austin and Christian) severely impacted by autism.

References

External links
 Pro Football Reference Career Stats
 More Career Stats
 Greenxoblue – Curt Warner 1988–89 Helmet Details

1961 births
Living people
People from Pineville, West Virginia
American football running backs
Penn State Nittany Lions football players
Seattle Seahawks players
Los Angeles Rams players
American Conference Pro Bowl players
College Football Hall of Fame inductees
Ed Block Courage Award recipients